Jaime Cleofas Martínez Veloz (born 9 April 1954) is a Mexican architect, writer and politician from the Party of the Democratic Revolution. He has served as Deputy of the LVI and LVIII Legislatures of the Mexican Congress representing Coahuila, as well as a local deputy in the XVI Legislature of the Congress of Baja California.

References

1954 births
Living people
Politicians from Torreón
Writers from Coahuila
Mexican architects
Mexican male writers
Party of the Democratic Revolution politicians
20th-century Mexican politicians
21st-century Mexican politicians
Autonomous University of Coahuila alumni
Members of the Congress of Baja California
Deputies of the LVIII Legislature of Mexico
Members of the Chamber of Deputies (Mexico) for Coahuila